Hans Ekkehard Bob (24 January 1917 – 12 August 2013) was a German fighter pilot, serving with the Luftwaffe. During World War II, Bob flew approximately 700 combat missions, and claimed 60 victories; 37 of which were on the Eastern Front.

Early Luftwaffe
Bob joined the Luftwaffe in 1936, at the rank of a Fahnenjunker (officer candidate), and began his flight training on 1 June 1937.

World War II
In 1939, prior to the Invasion of Poland, Bob was transferred to the newly formed 3./Jagdgeschwader 21 (JG 21) (later known as the "Devils Squadron"), which was redesignated on 6 June 1940 into 9./Jagdgeschwader 54 (JG 54). It was equipped with the Messerschmitt Bf 109 fighter, an aircraft Bob would become very familiar with over the years – flying every model except the Kurfürst.

During the French campaign on 10 May 1940, Bob claimed his first victory when he shot down a Gloster Gladiator over Tongeren in Belgium. That August, he was promoted to the rank of Oberleutnant.  On 10 October 1940, he was appointed Staffelkapitän of 7./JG 54 for a short period; he was soon appointed Staffelkapitän of 9./JG 54.

During the Battle of Britain, 9./JG 54 was activated as a Jabo unit, targeting shipping vessels. By November 1940, Bob had recorded 19 kills, and was awarded the Knight's Cross of the Iron Cross (Ritterkreuz des Eisernen Kreuzes) by Reichsmarschall Hermann Göring on 7 March 1941.

On 21 March 1941, Bob survived, unhurt, a ditching into Cherbourg harbour with his Bü 131 training aircraft, which had suffered engine failure. After the Battle of Britain, he participated in the Balkan campaign, where he recorded his 20th and 21st victories. JG 54 was re-equipped with the new Bf 109 F and relocated to airfields in Prussia, in preparation for Operation Barbarossa, the invasion of Russia.

On 23 June 1941, Hans Ekkehard Bob recorded his first victory in Russian airspace – a Tupolev SB twin-engined bomber.  During this combat, his Bf 109 F-2 was hit by return fire, resulting in a forced landing behind enemy lines. He evaded capture and returned to his unit two days later. Between 13 July and 30 October 1941, Bob made three more emergency landings due to aircraft combat damage behind enemy lines, but in each case returned to his unit.

On 29 September 1942, Bob had his 50th victory, and was promoted to Hauptmann later that year. Flying on the Eastern Front ended for Hans Ekkehard Bob and III./JG 54 in February 1943, after he received orders from General der Jagdflieger Adolf Galland to change positions with elements of the then French-based JG 26.  This order was later cancelled, but III. Gruppe stayed on the Western Front, separated from the rest of the 'Greenhearts', serving initially in northern Germany with Jagdgeschwader 1.

On 17 April 1943, Bob recorded his 57th victory; the ramming of a USAAF Boeing B-17 bomber near Bremen with his Bf 109 G-6.  He bailed out and survived the crash without injury. On 1 August, Bob was promoted to the rank of Major and was appointed Gruppenkommandeur of IV./JG 54. He returned to the Eastern Front, where he scored a further two victories.

By May 1944, Bob was back at the Western Front as Gruppenkommandeur of II./Jagdgeschwader 3 (JG 3), based in the Normandy invasion front corridor, flying Reichsverteidigung (Defense of the Reich) duties. In August, he was transferred to Erprobungskommando 262 where he learned to fly the Messerschmitt Me 262.

In early 1945, his experience led to his becoming a member of General der Flieger Josef Kammhuber's staff.  Bob was responsible for allocating newly built Me 262's to operational units.  Later, he took command of I. and II./EJG 2 and was responsible for practice and training former bomber pilots in flying the Me 262.

Bob was one of the aces chosen to fly as a member of the jet fighter unit JV 44, led by Adolf Galland. In the final days of World War II, Bob was responsible for building a longer runway at Innsbruck airfield for the Me 262 jets. At the capitulation on 8 May 1945, Bob was in Kappl, a small village near Salzburg.

After the war
Bob returned to civilian life working as a farm labourer. In 1946, he founded his own transport company.

Around this time, he met Waldemar Wübke, an old JV 44 comrade, and a friend from his time in JG 54. Bob always told Wübke's history with a smile on his face. Wübke still wore his old uniform and officer cap as he was questioned by a British officer. "Why are you wearing this old stuff?" Wübke replied, "Do I ask you if your grandma has hemorrhoids?" He never met Wübke again, and Wübke later died in the early 1950s in Argentina, the result of injuries sustained in an airliner crash.

In 1956, Bob established the Celle Flying Club.

From 30 September to 1 October 2000, Bob also was among the historical figures at the 60th anniversary of the Battle of Britain in Santa Monica, California.

In 2012, he appeared in the documentary series Heroes Of The Skies (Air Aces) as the German representative ace of the Luftwaffe.

Bob had been married to his wife Christa for over 50 years. They had three children: Roland, Elmar and Delia. He also had three other children with his first wife. He died on 12 August 2013.

Summary of career

Aerial victory claims
According to US historian David T. Zabecki, Bob was credited with 60 aerial victories.

Awards
 Iron Cross (1939)
 2nd Class (17 September 1939)
 1st Class
 Ehrenpokal der Luftwaffe (28 September 1940)
 German Cross in Gold on 24 December 1942 as Oberleutnant in the 9./Jagdgeschwader 54
 Knight's Cross of the Iron Cross on 7 March 1941 as Oberleutnant and Staffelkapitän of the 9./Jagdgeschwader 54

Notes

References

Citations

Bibliography

 
 Bob, Hans-Ekkehard (2003). Betrayed Ideals, Memoirs of a Luftwaffe Fighter Ace. Cerberus Publishing Ltd. .
 Bob, Hans-Ekkehard (2011). Jagdgeschwader 54 — Die Piloten mit den grünen Herzen (in German). Aachen, Germany: Helios Verlags- und Buchvertriebsgesellschaft. .
 
Forsyth, Robert (1996). JV 44: The Galland Circus. Classic Publications. .
 
 
 Ries, Karl and Obermaier, Ernst (1991). Luftwaffe Rudder Markings 1936–1945. Schiffer Publishing. .
 
 
 Trautloft, Hannes and Bob, Hans-Ekkehard (2005). War Diaries of Hannes Trautloft Kommodore of JG54 Grunherz. Cerberus Publishing Ltd. .
 

1917 births
2013 deaths
Luftwaffe pilots
German World War II flying aces
Recipients of the Gold German Cross
Recipients of the Knight's Cross of the Iron Cross
Military personnel from Freiburg im Breisgau
People from the Grand Duchy of Baden
Pilots who performed an aerial ramming